The women's pole vault event at the 2006 Commonwealth Games was held on March 23–25.

Medalists

Results

Qualification
Qualification: 4.30 m (Q) or at least 12 best (q) qualified for the final.

Final

References
Results

Pole
2006
2006 in women's athletics